Cem Özdemir (born 21 December 1965) is a German politician who currently serves as Federal Minister of Food and Agriculture since 2021. He is a member of the Alliance 90/The Greens party.

Between 2008 and 2018, Özdemir co-chaired the Green Party, together with Claudia Roth and later Simone Peter. He has been a Member of the German Bundestag since 2013, previously holding a seat between 1994 and 2002. From 2004 to 2009, he served as a Member of the European Parliament. Alongside Katrin Göring-Eckardt, he stood as one of the top two Green candidates in the 2017 federal election. From 2018 until 2021, he chaired the Bundestag Committee on Transport. Since 8 December 2021, he has been Minister of Food and Agriculture in the cabinet of Chancellor Olaf Scholz.

Life and work 
Born in Urach, a small town in the hills between Stuttgart and Ulm, Cem Özdemir is the son of Gastarbeiter ("guest worker") parents from Turkey. Özdemir's father is of Circassian origin and is originally from Tokat. Özdemir's mother is of Turkish origin and comes from a middle-class family in Istanbul; her father was an officer in the Turkish War of Independence. In 1983 Özdemir and his immigrant parents acquired German citizenship. After graduating from a German Hauptschule and a Realschule Özdemir completed an apprenticeship, becoming an early childhood educator. After qualifying for advanced technical college entrance he studied social pedagogy at the Evangelical Technical College in Reutlingen, Germany. After completing his studies in 1987, he worked as an educator and a freelance journalist.

Özdemir describes himself as a "secular Muslim" and is married to the Argentine journalist Pía María Castro. They have two children: a son and a daughter. Özdemir is a vegetarian.

Political career

Beginnings 
Özdemir has been a member of the Green Party since 1981, originally in the district chapter of Ludwigsburg. Between 1989 and 1994 he was a member in the State Executive (Landesvorstand) of the Green Party in Baden-Württemberg. During that time he was one of the founding members of Immi-Grün – Bündnis der neuen InländerInnen, an alliance of InländerInnen (locals), as opposed to the German word Ausländer (foreigners).

Member of the German Bundestag, 1994–2002 
From 1994 until 2002, Özdemir was a member of the German Bundestag; along with Leyla Onur of the Social Democrats, he was the first person of  either Turkish or Circassian descent ever elected to the country's federal parliament. From 1998 until 2002, he was a member of the Committee on Home Affairs and served as his parliamentary group's spokesperson on this issue. In this capacity, he advocated for reforms to Germany's citizenship laws. In addition, he was the chairman of the German-Turkish Parliamentary Friendship Group.

In 1999, nine months after the Greens for the first time joined a German federal government under Chancellor Gerhard Schröder, Özdemir was among 40 younger party members of the self-described "youth of the second generation" who declared in a controversial manifesto "[that] we cannot and will not idly watch the moralizing know-it-alls in our party from the founding generation" around Jürgen Trittin.

In 2002, Özdemir was accused of violating parliamentary regulations for retaining "Miles & More" frequent-flier miles accrued during official travel as a member of the Bundestag for personal use. He was also criticised for having taken out a credit with Moritz Hunzinger, a German PR consultant and lobbyist, in order to overcome personal financial issues. This affair was also associated with Rudolf Scharping, former German Minister of Defence (1998–2002). Subsequently, Özdemir resigned as spokesman for domestic affairs and as a member of the Bundestag.

In 2003, Özdemir joined the German Marshall Fund of the United States in Washington, D.C. and Brussels as a Transatlantic Fellow. During his fellowship he gave various speeches and brown bag lectures at the University of Wisconsin-Madison, on the issue of Turkey and Europe. He also researched on the ways that minority groups in the United States and Europe organize themselves politically.

Member of the European Parliament, 2004–2009 

From 2004 until 2009, Özdemir was a Member of the European Parliament in the parliamentary group The Greens/European Free Alliance (Greens/EFA). During that time he served as the group's spokesperson on foreign policy and a member of the Committee on Foreign Affairs (AFET). In addition, he served as the European Parliament's rapporteur on Central Asia and as vice chair of the Permanent Ad Hoc Delegation for Relations with Iraq.

Between 2006 and 2007, Özdemir also served as vice president of the "CIA Committee" (Temporary Committee on the alleged use of European countries by the CIA for the transport and illegal detention of prisoners).

Co-chair of the Green Party, 2009–2013 
On 2 June 2008, Özdemir announced his candidacy as co-chair of his party. Özdemir's rival candidate was Volker Ratzmann, leader of the Green parliamentary group in the Berlin House of Representatives, who eventually withdrew his candidacy on 4 September 2008 for personal reasons.

In the run-up to the party co-chair elections, Özdemir also ran for a promising party list position for the 2009 German elections at the federal state party conference of Baden-Württemberg. In two separate runs he lost to his respective direct opponents. Nevertheless, Özdemir adhered to his candidacy for the party chairmanship.

Since 15 November 2008, Özdemir has been one of two co-chairs of Alliance 90/The Greens. He received 79.2 percent of the delegate votes.

In the 2009 elections, Özdemir was not elected to the Bundestag. As a candidate in the constituency of Stuttgart I, which covers south Stuttgart he polled 29.9%, but lost to Stefan Kaufmann, the candidate of the CDU.

Member of the German Bundestag, 2013–present 
Özdemir re-entered the Bundestag as a result of the 2013 elections. He served as deputy chairman of the German-Chinese Parliamentary Friendship Group. In 2017, Özdemir ran for the male top candidacy of the Greens in the subsequent federal election and narrowly won the party membership election over Schleswig-Holstein Deputy Minister-President Robert Habeck and Bundestag parliamentary leader Anton Hofreiter by only 75 votes. He led the Greens into the federal election alongside parliamentary leader Katrin Göring-Eckhardt. Following the election, the Greens were first expected to form a government with the CDU and the FDP, in which Özdemir was widely expected to become the Minister of Foreign Affairs. However, when the FDP abruptly ended the negotiations, this fell apart. Özdemir had already declared not to stand for reelection as party leader (with Robert Habeck succeeding him), and the parliamentary leadership had been reelected directly after the federal election, so there was no leadership post left for him. Instead, from 2018 until 2021, he chaired the Bundestag Committee on Transport. Nevertheless, Özdemir remained one of the most popular politicians of the country and at times even was the most popular politician, placed before Angela Merkel.

In September 2019, Özdemir unsuccessfully challenged incumbents Katrin Göring-Eckardt and Anton Hofreiter at the middle of the legislative term and announced his candidacy to co-chair the Green Party's parliamentary group, together with Kirsten Kappert-Gonther. Following the announcement of Fritz Kuhn to not seek re-election as Mayor of Stuttgart in 2020, Özdemir was widely considered a potential successor. Shortly after, he decided not to run for the position. In the negotiations to form a coalition government under the leadership of Minister-President of Baden-Württemberg Winfried Kretschmann following the 2021 state elections, Özdemir was a member of the working group on economic affairs, labor and innovation.

In May 2021, several months ahead of the national elections, various media outlets reported that Özdemir had been late to declare to the German Parliament's administration a total of €20,580 in additional income he had received over the course of five years – 2014 through  2018 – in his capacity as leader of the Green Party. In the negotiations to form a so-called traffic light coalition of the Social Democrats (SPD), the Green Party and the FDP following the 2021 federal elections, Özdemir led his party's delegation in the working group on economic policy; his co-chairs from the other parties were Carsten Schneider and Michael Theurer.

Agriculture Minister, 2021–present
Following the 2021 German federal election, the Greens entered government as part of a traffic light coalition led by Social Democrat Chancellor Olaf Scholz, and Özdemir was sworn in as Food and Agriculture Minister on 8 December 2021. The appointment of Özdemir, instead of outgoing parliamentary leader and biologist Anton Hofreiter by the party leaders Robert Habeck and Annalena Baerbock came after infighting within the party over the Agriculture Ministry, and was seen as somewhat surprising, since he had no prior experience in agriculture policy and was considered to be a moderate within the Greens, while Hofreiter was left-leaning. However, Özdemir had also been one of the most prominent and popular politicians in Germany for several years.

Özdemir is the only minister in the Scholz cabinet to come from an ethnic minority, and is the first government minister of Turkish descent in Germany's history.

Political positions 
Within the Green Party, Özdemir is associated with the centrist "Realo" faction.

European integration 
In 2011, Özdemir called for European Union citizens to get more direct influence in European affairs via plebiscites on key policy issues.

Amid the 2013 Cypriot financial crisis, Özdemir proposed making an EU bailout for Cyprus conditional on reviving talks about reunification of the island divided since 1974.

Relations with Belarus 
On 16 December 2020, he undertook patronage over Katsiaryna Barysevich, Belarusian journalist and political prisoner. On 31 May 2021, he took over the godparenthood of Raman Pratasevich, Belarusian political prisoner.

Relations with Russia 
In 2011, Özdemir stepped down from the Quadriga Award's board of trustees to protest the nonprofit group's decision to honor Prime Minister Vladimir Putin of Russia. The groups decision sparked a public outcry and the annual prize ceremony was later canceled. After a two-day visit to Armenia, Özdemir tweeted in reference to Armenia's recent accession into the Eurasian Economic Union that "The closer Yerevan moves towards Putin's Russia, the less freedom for media, NGOs, LGBT. People want open society."

Relations with Turkey 

Özdemir opposes the accession of Turkey to the European Union under President Erdogan. When Özdemir criticised Prime Minister Recep Tayyip Erdoğan of Turkey in a speech he delivered in Cologne in May 2014, Erdoğan personally targeted Özdemir during one of his party's group meetings in the parliament declaring him "a so-called Turk" and described his criticisms as "very ugly". Upon Erdoğan's attacks, the Turkish ambassador in Berlin, Hüseyin Avni Karslıoğlu, was summoned to the German Foreign Office and was informed about Germany's unease on the prime minister's remarks. Soon after, Özdemir told Spiegel Online it would be "irresponsible" for German intelligence services not to target Turkey given its location as a transit country for Islamic State of Iraq and the Levant militants from Europe.

Özdemir was a driving force behind the Bundestag's recognition of the Armenian Genocide in June 2016, which angered Turkey. He has also been critical of Turkey's mass arrests and crackdown on dissent following a failed coup attempt in July 2016.  Özdemir condemned the Turkish invasion of northern Syria aimed at ousting U.S.-backed Syrian Kurds from the enclave of Afrin. He met with Turkish officials during the 2018 Munich Security Conference, during which he was reportedly called a "terrorist" and received various other threats from the Turkish delegation. As a result, Özdemir received special police protection.

Relations with Saudi Arabia 
Özdemir called for the German government to stop giving contracts to the American consultancy firm McKinsey & Company, which was accused of gathering information for the Saudi Arabia's regime about its critics.

Armenian genocide 
On 12 March 2015 Özdemir visited the Armenian Genocide memorial in Yerevan, Armenia and declared his formal recognition of the Armenian genocide and called on Turkey to recognize it as well. In an interview he stated: "I think that Germany should obviously refer to the Armenian genocide issue. As a friend of two countries, we should help to open the Armenian-Turkish border. As a friend of both countries, we should exert effort, so that the Armenian-Turkish relations become like the French-German or Polish-German relations."

In 2016 Özdemir initiated a resolution in the Bundestag that would formally classify the 1915 massacres as genocide. The resolution passed on 2 June 2016 with what Speaker Norbert Lammert called a "remarkable majority". At the time, Özdemir emphasized that the resolution was not designed to point fingers at others but rather to acknowledge Germany's partial responsibility for the genocide. In 1915, the German Empire was an ally of the Ottoman Empire and failed to condemn the violence. After the Bundestag's approval of the resolution, Turkish media "waged a war" against him and  he received multiple death threats.

Legalization of cannabis 
Özdemir advocates legalizing cannabis. In December 2014, his parliamentary immunity from prosecution was lifted when Berlin prosecutors opened an investigation into suspected growing of drugs after an Ice Bucket Challenge video showed him with a cannabis plant in the background. In a subsequent interview with Westdeutsche Allgemeine Zeitung, Özdemir stated that "in a free society it should be up to each individual person to decide whether they want to consume cannabis and take the associated risks."

The United Nations 
Özdemir is a supporter of the Campaign for the Establishment of a United Nations Parliamentary Assembly, an organisation which campaigns for democratic reformation of the United Nations. He believes it is necessary "to give voice to every citizen, woman and man, all over the world; to create legitimacy by true representation, and to enhance political responsibility of the states' leaders."

Speed limit 
Özdemir is in favour of a general speed limit on German Autobahns. According to him, "The introduction of a maximum speed on motorways in Germany would have only advantages: fewer traffic fatalities, immediate climate protection and practically no costs". Furthermore, he stated that "A speed limit would be a requirement of common sense for an enlightened society in the 21st century". He compared the debate of speed limits in Germany with that of the right to bear arms in the United States.

Other activities

Corporate boards 
 Landwirtschaftliche Rentenbank, Deputy Chair of the Supervisory Board (since 2021)
 KfW, Ex-Officio Member of the Board of Supervisory Directors (since 2021)
 Deutsche Telekom, Yes, I can! Initiative for Children and Young People, Member of the Board of Trustees

Non-profit organizations 
 Peace of Westphalia Prize, Member of the Jury (since 2022)
 Berlin office of the American Jewish Committee (AJC), Member of the Advisory Board
 Das Progressive Zentrum, Member of the Circle of Friends
 European Council on Foreign Relations (ECFR), Founding Member
 German Association for Small and Medium-Sized Businesses (BVMW), Member of the Political Advisory Board
 German-Turkish Forum of Stuttgart, Member of the Board of Trustees
 Heinrich Böll Foundation, Member of the Europe/Transatlantic Advisory Board
 Stiftung neue verantwortung, Member of the Presidium
 Theodor Heuss Foundation, Member of the Board of Trustees
 Amadeu Antonio Foundation, Founding Member
 Berlin Center for Torture Victims, Member of the Advisory Board (1998–2002)
 ZDF, Member of the Television Board (2009–2013)

Recognition 
 2018 – Ramer Award for Courage in the Defense of Democracy
 2011 – Foreign Policy List of Top Global Thinkers
 2009 – Honorary doctorate of the Tunceli University
 1996 – Theodor Heuss Medal

Bibliography 
 Currywurst und Döner – Integration in Deutschland 
 Ich bin Inländer (autobiography) 
 Die Türkei: Politik, Religion, Kultur

References

External links 

 

1965 births
Living people
Agriculture ministers of Germany

German Muslims
German people of Turkish descent
20th-century German educators
Alliance 90/The Greens MEPs
German people of Circassian descent
German politicians of Turkish descent
Members of the Bundestag for Alliance 90/The Greens
Members of the Bundestag for Baden-Württemberg
Members of the Bundestag 2021–2025
Members of the Bundestag 2017–2021
Members of the Bundestag 2013–2017
Members of the Bundestag 1994–1998
MEPs for Germany 2004–2009
People from Bad Urach
Turkish people of Circassian descent